is a Japanese manga artist, best known as the creator of the series Shadow Skill and Saint Seiya Episode.G.

Works 

 In 1999, he creates the manga , which was serialized in the magazine Afternoon and published by Kodansha. 6 volumes completed in 2003.
 Shadow Skill (Shadō Sukiru), Published by Takeshobo, Magazine	Comic Gamma 1992–1996, 4 volumes.
 Shadow Skil: Phantom Of Shade - Black Howling - Black Wing, Published by Fujimi Shobo (1996–1998) (Kodansha (2001–2014) Seinen Magazine, 11 volumes.
 In 2002, he begins writing and illustrating the spin-off manga Saint Seiya Episode.G, based on Masami Kurumada's Saint Seiya manga. Published by Akita Shoten and serialized in the monthly magazine Champion Red. This work is 20 volumes .
  (story, with art by Ranmaru Tenma):Serialized in Comic Gamma and published in 1 volumes by Takeshobo1994.
  (story, with art by Ranmaru Tenma):Serialized in Monthly Shōnen Gangan and published in 1 volumes by Square Enix in 1996.
  (art and story):Serialized in Comic Dragon and published in 1 volumes by Kadokawa Shoten in 2001.
  (story, with art by Ranmaru Tenma):Serialized in Comic BonBon and published in 1 volumes by Kodansha between 2001 and 2002.
  (story, with art by Ranmaru Tenma):Published in Akita Shoten's Champion Red in 2009, 1 volumes.

References

External links 

  
  
 
 

1971 births
Japanese illustrators
Living people
Manga artists from Tokyo